The Pay-Off may refer to:
 The Pay-Off (1930 film)
 The Pay-Off (1926 film)